Eric Weissling (born January 20, 1988) is a professional basketball coach of Mexican, American and German descent.

Career 
He began his professional career as a player assistant with the San Antonio Spurs of the NBA 2004–2012, while he was there he worked with players such as: Tim Duncan, Manu Ginobili, Tony Parker, Bruce Bowen and many more. During these seven years he was part of two NBA championships; the first in 2004–2005 against Detroit Pistons and the second in 2006–2007 against the Cleveland Cavaliers.

When he finished his training at St. Mary's University, he decided to develop as a coach and began to work in professional teams of leagues affiliated with FIBA, National Professional Basketball League LNBP and Pacific Basketball Circuit CIBACOPA. During this period he worked as a player developer, scout, video analysis and training for teams such as: Halcones UV Xalapa (2011-2013) with a lapse of an intermission back to the San Antonio Spurs ; Pioneros de Los Mochis (2014) as head coach in some games; Halcones Rojos de Veracruz (2014-2016) as interim strength and conditioning coach as well as headhunter; Nauticos de Mazatlán (2015-2018); Garzas de Plata UAEH (2016-2017) that during this time, he graduated from Xavier University with a master's degree in Athlete Development and Coaching Education; Laguneros de La Comarca (2018-2019), Panthers of Aguascalientes (2019) and Deer of Mazatlán (2019-2020).

In 2013, he was assistant coach of the Mexico National Team 2013 Gold Medalist FIBA and served as main video coordinator in charge of the exploration towards the 2013 FIBA Americas Championship, where they played a historic role winning the gold medal, same that was not obtained by the National Team of Mexico since 1973. They also received the "National Sports Award", Gold medal in the Central American Championship COCABA. In 2014 he returned to the National Team as a scout and assistant coach for the Central American and Caribbean Games.

In 2016, he was head coach of the Nauticos de Mazatlán, during that time he was the youngest head coach to win a championship in the Professional Basketball League CIBACOPA at age 27; that same year Latinbasket.com would appoint him Coach of the year; also won the Jump 10 World Hoops Challenge in Shanghai, China, with the National Nautical Team of Mexico.

He led Laguneros de La Comarca as head coach for the inaugural season of this young professional LNBP team in 2018. He was considered the youngest head coach to lead the National League of the LNBP, breaking barriers and records that few have achieved before, while commanding a team of the highest professional league from Mexico at the age of 30. He was also invited to compete in the NBA G-League preseason against the Rio Grande Valley Vipers, with an international friendly match against Laguneros. As of 2019, Coach Weissling made the decision to leave Laguneros and go over and lead a more recognized organization in Panteras de Aguascalientes to close the end of the 2018-2019 LNBP season.

In the 2019–2020 season, Coach Weisling worked hard to return to the United States to the NBA and NBA G League. Before focusing on the adventure in the United States, Coach Weissling led a talented team National Team of Venados de México to participate in the World Top Ten Basketball Challenge 2019. The team would continue that summer to defeat title contenders in Great Britain, China and both teams from the United States. In the championship game, Mexico would end up falling short against a talented and athletic team from Canada, losing in a tight overtime game and finishing as runner-up in 2019.

In the fall of 2019, Coach Weissling competed in the NBA G-League preseason with a collective all-star team from Mexico composed of players from the CIBACOPA professional league. The game was played against the Rio Grande Valley Vipers, current champions of the 2019 NBA G-League.

To kick off 2020, Coach Weisling will be appointed to the staff of the Mexico men's national team, take on the role of one of the best coaches in the FIBA AmeriCup qualifier, and receive a great honor for the Olympic qualification. Summer 2020 will take place in Split, Croatia. Due to the spread and spread of the COVID-19 pandemic, the Olympic preliminaries will be suspended until 2021, when Mexico will compete with Russia, Germany and other difficult groups to compete for Japan's solo entries to the 2021 Olympics. Additionally, AmeriCup is in conflict with the United States.

Puerto Rico was also suspended until further notice. As Coach Weislin assumes the important responsibility of helping the best Mexican players at the highest international level, Eric will also be appointed as the new head coach of the Vietnam National League VBA Hanoi Buffalo. This VBA season will also be postponed from spring to fall, so that Coach Weissling has time to begin preparations, while learning conversational Vietnamese to better communicate with the players. Coach Weisling will be one of the first FIBA professional coaches with Mexican descent and experience, he will be able to train abroad and break down barriers to become the first Mexican-American professional coach to sign in Asia.

Teams 
2004-2011 San Antonio Spurs, National NBA Basketball Association, Assistant Player and Assistant Costume (CHAMPIONS 2005 and 2007).
2011-2012 Halcones UV Xalapa, National Professional Basketball League, FIBA Mexico, Assistant Coach and Head of Scouting.
2012-2013 Halcones UV Xalapa, National Professional Basketball League, FIBA Mexico, Assistant Coach and Head of Scouting.
2013 Mexico National Team, FIBA COCABA Central American Championship, Assistant Coach and Head of Scouting (GOLD MEDAL).
Mexico National Team 2013, FIBA Americas Championships, Assistant Coach and Head of Scouting (GOLD MEDAL).
2014 Pioneros de Los Mochis, CIBACOPA Professional, FIBA Mexico, Assistant Coach and Head of Scouting.
2014 Mexico National Team, Central American and Caribbean Games, Assistant Coach and Head of Scouting.
2014-2015 Halcones Rojos de Veracruz, National Professional Basketball League, FIBA Mexico, Assistant Coach and Head of Scouting.
2015 Náuticos de Mazatlán, CIBACOPA Professional, FIBA Mexico, Assistant Coach and Head of Scouting.
2015-2016 Halcones Rojos de Veracruz, National Professional Basketball League, FIBA Mexico, Assistant Coach, Head of Scouting.
2016 Náuticos de Mazatlán, CIBACOPA Professional, FIBA México, Head Coach. (CHAMPIONS, COACH OF THE YEAR).
National Nautical Team of Mexico 2016, Jump 10 World Hoops Challenge, Shanghai China; Assistant coach (CHAMPIONS).
2016-2017 Garzas de Plata UAEH, National Professional Basketball League, FIBA Mexico, Assistant Coach and Head of Scouting.
2017 Náuticos de Mazatlán, CIBACOPA Professional, FIBA México, Head Coach.
2018 Náuticos de Mazatlán, CIBACOPA Professional, FIBA México, Head Coach.
2018-2019 Laguneros de la Comarca, National Professional Basketball League, FIBA Mexico; Coach.
Panteras de Aguascalientes, National Professional Basketball League, FIBA Mexico; Coach.
2019 Venados de Mazatlán, CIBACOPA Professional, FIBA México, Head Coach.
Mexico National Team Venados 2019, Jump 10 World Hoops Challenge, Shanghai China; Head Coach (SILVER MEDAL)
CIBACOPA Mexico 2019 National Team, Head Coach; NBA G-League Preseason (vs. Rio Grande Valley Vipers)

References

1988 births
Living people